Mordellistena sudaniensis is a species of beetle in the genus Mordellistena of the family Mordellidae. It was described by Ray in 1944.

References

External links
Coleoptera. BugGuide.

Beetles described in 1944
sudaniensis